The NASCAR Craftsman Truck Series Championship Race is a NASCAR Craftsman Truck Series race that takes place at Phoenix Raceway. The race has been the last race of the year for the Truck Series since 2020.

History

From 1995 until 1998, two races were held each year at Phoenix for the series. The first of the two Phoenix races in 1995 was the first-ever race for the series in its history. Since 1999, the track has had one Truck Series race each year and which has been held the fall each year except for 1999 and 2000 when it was held in March and 2011 when it was held in February.

In 2023, when Craftsman became the title sponsor of the Truck Series, they took over the title sponsorship of the race, replacing Lucas Oil.

Past winners

 2001, 2002, 2009, 2012, 2020, and 2022: Race extended due to NASCAR overtime. 2001 race took 2 attempts.
 2014: Race shortened due to power outage.

Multiple winners (drivers)

Multiple winners (teams)

Manufacturer wins

References

External links
 

NASCAR Truck Series races
 
Annual sporting events in the United States
1995 establishments in Arizona
Recurring sporting events established in 1995